Enter the Dragon is a martial arts film starring Bruce Lee that was released in 1973.
 Enter the Dragon (soundtrack), the official soundtrack for the film

Enter the Dragon may also refer to:

People 
 Ding Junhui, a Chinese professional snooker player with the nickname Enter the Dragon

Professional wrestling 
 DGUSA Enter the Dragon, a professional wrestling pay-per-view event that took place in 2009

Television 
 "Enter the Dragon" (2point4 Children), an episode from the eighth series of the TV sitcom 2point4 Children
 "Enter the Dragon" (Xiaolin Showdown), an episode from the second season of the TV series Xiaolin Showdown
 "Enter the Dragon" (Once Upon a Time), an episode from the fourth season of the TV series Once Upon a Time

See also 
 Spyro: Enter the Dragonfly, a 2002 video game for the PlayStation 2 console
 Ender Dragon, a character in the video game Minecraft